John Emil Anderson was an American football coach.  He served as head football coach at Knox College in Galesburg, Illinois in 1917 and Rice University in 1918, compiling a career college football coaching record of 5–7–2.  Anderson played college football at the University of Chicago under Amos Alonzo Stagg.  He was an assistant coach at Chicago under Stagg in 1908 and coached at Morgan Park Military Academy in 1910.

Head coaching record

References

Year of birth missing
Year of death missing
American football centers
Chicago Maroons football coaches
Chicago Maroons football players
Knox Prairie Fire football coaches
Rice Owls football coaches
High school football coaches in Illinois